Lemuel L. Burnham (born August 30, 1947) is a former American football defensive end who played three seasons with the Philadelphia Eagles of the National Football League (NFL). He was drafted by the Kansas City Chiefs in the fifteenth round of the 1974 NFL Draft. He first enrolled at Santa Ana Junior College before transferring to U.S. International University. Burnham attended Jewett High School in Winter Haven, Florida. He was also a member of The Hawaiians, Washington Redskins and Winnipeg Blue Bombers.

Professional career
Burnham was selected by the Kansas City Chiefs with the 378th pick in the 1974 NFL Draft. He released by the Chiefs before the start of the 1974 season. He was selected by The Hawaiians with the 201st pick in the 1974 WFL Draft and played for the team from 1974 to 1975. Burnham spent the 1976 off-season with the Washington Redskins and was released by the team on August 24, 1976. He traveled to Canada to join the Winnipeg Blue Bombers a day after being released by the Redskins. He played in one game for the Blue Bombers during the 1976 season. He played in 45 games for the Philadelphia Eagles from 1977 to 1979. He led the Eagles in sacks with ten in 1977. He spent the 1980 season on injured reserve due to a knee injury suffered in training camp. Burnham announced his retirement from football on July 22, 1981.

Military career
Burnham served four years in the United States Marine Corps from 1965 to 1969, including thirteen months with the 3rd Marine Division in Vietnam. He won a Good Conduct Medal, National Defense Service Medal, Combat Action Ribbon, Naval Unit Citation, Presidential Unit Citation, Vietnam Service Medal and Vietnam Campaign Medal during his time in the Marines. He was honorably discharged from the Marines.

Personal life
Burnham worked as the team psychologist for the Philadelphia Eagles, Philadelphia 76ers and Baltimore Orioles from 1986 to 1992. He was the director and vice president of player and employee development of the NFL from 1992 to 2002. He was also the mastermind behind the NFL Rookie Symposium, which debuted in 1997. Burnham is a member of the NFL Alumni Association and the current vice president for the Philadelphia chapter. He is also a life member of the Maxwell Football Club.

He earned his Bachelor of Arts degree in psychology from U.S. International University in 1974. Burnham then acquired his Master of Science degree in counseling psychology from Bemidji State University in 1978. He earned his Ph.D. in psychology from Temple University in 1984. He is a diplomate of the American Psychotherapy Association and the American Board of Psychological Specialties. Burnham is also a member of the American Psychological Association, the Association for Psychological Science and the American College of Forensic Examiners. He is the psychology program coordinator at Wilmington University. He is also a member of Pi Gamma Mu.

Burnham was a founding director of the Corporate Alliance to End Partner Violence in 1995. He was appointed to the National Advisory Council on Violence Against Women in 1995.

Burnham provides sports psychology services to professional athletes through ProWorldAthletes, Inc. He is the author of "Personality in Group: Group Relevant Personality and Sociometric Status". He is also the author of "Beyond X's And O's", a handbook for coaches to identify and manage player related issues. Burnham is the co-author of two performance improvement publications called "The Athletic Success Profile" and "The Personal Success Profile." He is an experienced public speaker and a member of Toastmasters International.

Family
His son Bryan plays for the BC Lions of the Canadian Football League. Lem's son Lewis played college football for the North Carolina Tar Heels. His daughter Shannon attended St. Francis College in Loretto, Pennsylvania on a basketball scholarship. His daughter Kara played basketball and volleyball at Montclair State University.

References

External links
Just Sports Stats

Living people
1947 births
Players of American football from Florida
American football defensive ends
Canadian football defensive linemen
African-American players of American football
African-American players of Canadian football
Santa Ana Dons football players
United States International Gulls football players
Kansas City Chiefs players
The Hawaiians players
Washington Redskins players
Winnipeg Blue Bombers players
Philadelphia Eagles players
United States Marine Corps personnel of the Vietnam War
African-American psychologists
21st-century American psychologists
Bemidji State University alumni
Temple University alumni
Wilmington University faculty
21st-century American non-fiction writers
American male non-fiction writers
American motivational writers
African-American non-fiction writers
Writers from Florida
People from Winter Haven, Florida
21st-century American male writers
20th-century African-American sportspeople
21st-century African-American writers
African-American male writers
20th-century American psychologists